Dhaka-19 is a constituency represented in the Jatiya Sangsad (National Parliament) of Bangladesh since 2014 by Md. Enamur Rahman of the Awami League.

Boundaries 
The constituency encompasses all but the four southernmost union parishads of Savar Upazila: Amin Bazar, Bhakurta, Kaundia, and Tetuljhora.

History 
The constituency was created when, ahead of the 2008 general election, the Election Commission redrew constituency boundaries to reflect population changes revealed by the 2001 Bangladesh census. The 2008 redistricting added 7 new seats to Dhaka District, increasing the number of constituencies in the district from 13 to 20. One of the new seats usurped the name Dhaka-12, and the former constituency of that name became Dhaka-19.

Ahead of the 2014 general election, the Election Commission reduced the boundaries of the constituency. Previously it had included one more union parishad of Savar Upazila: Kaundia.

Members of Parliament

Elections

Elections in the 2010s 
Md. Enamur Rahman was elected unopposed in the 2014 general election after opposition parties withdrew their candidacies in a boycott of the election.

Elections in the 2000s

References

External links
 

Parliamentary constituencies in Bangladesh
Dhaka District